Brandon Ivan Servania (born March 12, 1999) is an American professional soccer player who plays as a midfielder for Major League Soccer club Toronto FC.

Career

College 
Servania played one year of college soccer at Wake Forest University in 2017, making 20 appearances, scoring 3 goals and tallying 11 assists. He was also named in the ACC All-Freshman Team.

Professional 
Following his freshman year in college, Servania opted to sign a homegrown player contract with FC Dallas on January 3, 2018. On May 18, 2018, Servania joined United Soccer League side Tulsa Roughnecks on loan.

On January 5, 2021, Servania was one of six FC Dallas players who went on a three-week training stint with German Bundesliga side Bayern Munich. On February 9, 2021, he moved on loan to Austrian Bundesliga side 
St. Pölten.

In February 2023, he was traded to Toronto FC in exchange for Jesús Jiménez.

International 
On October 23, 2018, Servania was called by coach Tab Ramos to be part of the 20-player roster representing United States U20 at the 2018 CONCACAF U-20 Championship. During the U-20 final against Mexico, Brandon cleared a shot off the line to preserve the 2–0 United States victory.

Servania received his first call-up to the senior United States team in January 2020, and his first cap in a victory over Costa Rica.

In mid-December 2020, Servania was called up by Puerto Rico at senior level for a training camp in the Dominican Republic from January 10 to 20, 2021. Servania declined the Puerto Rico invitation.

Personal life
Growing up in Alabama, Servania started to play soccer at age six. He kicked off his youth career with Birmingham United Soccer Club from U-11 to U-14 before playing for Vestavia Hills Soccer Club in Alabama.

Servania has a younger brother, Jaden, who plays for North Carolina FC in USL League One. Despite being born in Birmingham, Alabama (like Brandon) Jaden represents Puerto Rico at the international level. Jaden was called to represent Puerto Rico at the 2018 CONCACAF U-20 Championship and Brandon was called to represent the United States in same tournament. On November 1, 2018, Brandon faced his brother when United States debuted in 2018 CONCACAF U-20 Championship against Puerto Rico. Both players played the entire match, Brandon in the midfield and Jaden in the attack.

Career statistics

Club

Honors 
North Texas SC
USL League One Regular Season Title: 2019
USL League One Championship: 2019

United States U20
CONCACAF U-20 Championship: 2018

Individual
CONCACAF Under-20 Championship Best XI: 2018

References

External links 
 
 
 Brandon Servania at Wake Forest
 

1999 births
Living people
American soccer players
American sportspeople of Puerto Rican descent
Association football midfielders
FC Dallas players
North Texas SC players
Soccer players from Birmingham, Alabama
Soccer players from Texas
FC Tulsa players
USL Championship players
USL League One players
United States men's under-20 international soccer players
United States men's youth international soccer players
Wake Forest Demon Deacons men's soccer players
Major League Soccer players
United States men's international soccer players
Homegrown Players (MLS)
SKN St. Pölten players
Toronto FC players